Barefooted Friends was a South Korean reality-variety show; a part of SBS's Good Sunday lineup, along with Running Man. It was first aired on April 21, 2013. The show is a "real outdoor hardship variety"; a spin on typical outdoor variety shows. The members experience "real happiness" with others through challenges. The words, Barefooted is supposed to mean essence, sincerity, and real hardships, where as Friends not only represents the cast, but the people that are met as well. It has garnered attention as being the come-back program for Kang Ho-dong, the main MC of the program, after leaving Good Sunday'''s X-man in April 2007. After a seven-month run, the program was cancelled due to low ratings and to make room for K-pop Star 3, with the final episode airing on November 17, 2013.

In 2020, due to the requests of Kim Hyun-Joong's Japanese fans, after the completion of his previous Japanese variety show "Raw Hyun-Joong", the Japanese Cable Television "Satellite Theatre (Eisei Gekijo)" began to air Barefooted Friends from June 28 till July 28.

 Format 

 Episode 1-6 
A new life experience meeting new people in a new place, and exploring the cultural heritage and natural environment unseen elsewhere, the members search for real beauty and happiness on foreign soil. The members travel to foreign countries to experience "real happiness" with locals. Unlike typical vacations, they live like locals and experience what a day in their life is like. Members must provide for themselves as no support from staff is given. The members experience the essence of culture, food, music, nature, and lifestyle while surviving on their own in the foreign country. This program is a differentiated real variety program providing affection and enlightenment to viewers.

 Episode 7-31 
The members take part in challenges based on different themes (diving, song writing, cooking, etc.).

 Cast 
The original members of Barefooted Friends are Kang Ho-dong, Yoon Jong-shin, Yoo Se-yoon, Kim Bum-soo, Kim Hyun-joong, Yoon Si-yoon, Eunhyuk, Uee Unlike the other members, this is the first time Kim Bum-soo, Kim Hyun-joong, Yoon Si-yoon, and Uee are participating in a variety show as regulars, and the synergy effect between the experienced variety seniors and rookies are anticipated. As of June 9, 2013, Yoo Se-yoon has left the program due to his DUI case, and will not appear from episode 10. Eun Ji-won has replaced him. On June 11, 2013, Kim Bum-soo suffered an injury to his knee during the recording of the Diving Special and was transported to a hospital. He has since left the program. Eunhyuk has not appeared on the program since the diving special, and is presumed to have left the program. On October 31, 2013, it was announced that Kim Hyun-joong has completed his final filming of the program and will be leaving due to schedule conflicts, airing November 3.

 List of episodes 

 2013 

 Ratings 
In the ratings below, the highest rating for the show will in be red, and the lowest rating for the show will be in blue.
Ratings listed below are the individual corner ratings of Barefooted Friends''. (Note: Individual corner ratings do not include commercial time, which regular ratings include.)

Awards and achievements

Notes

References

External links 
  Barefooted Friend Official homepage

Seoul Broadcasting System original programming
South Korean variety television shows
2013 South Korean television series debuts
2013 South Korean television series endings
Korean-language television shows
Television series by SM C&C